John Moll may refer to:
 John L. Moll, American electrical engineer
 John Selwyn Moll, English banker, British Army officer and rugby union player